North Lancashire was a county constituency of the House of Commons of the Parliament of the United Kingdom. It was represented by two Members of Parliament. The constituency was created by the Great Reform Act of 1832 by the splitting of Lancashire constituency into Northern and Southern divisions.

Great Reform Act of 1832

The Representation of the People Act 1832 reformed the distribution of seats in England and Wales. It introduced the principle of splitting the shire counties into divisions and returning two Members for each division rather than for the whole county and it also reformed the Parliamentary boroughs that were entitled to send Members to Parliament.8 Schedule A listed boroughs that were to be abolished and it included Newton. Schedule B listed boroughs to return a single Member to subsequent Parliaments and Clitheroe was listed.

Schedules C and D of the Act listed the newly created Parliamentary boroughs. Those in Schedule C were to return two Members and these included Manchester, Bolton, Blackburn and Oldham in Lancashire. Those in Schedule D were to become single seat boroughs and included Ashton-under-Lyne, Bury, Rochdale, Salford, and Warrington.

Schedule F of the Act listed the counties to be divided into two divisions, both of which would return two Members. Lancashire was one of those listed. The Boundary Commission proposals that followed the Act, published in 1832, made recommendations on the boundaries of the Parliamentary boroughs and divisions of counties that had been listed in Schedule F.9 These were then implemented by the Parliamentary Boundaries Act 1832.

The divisions of the county were based on the hundreds of Lancashire. The hundreds of Amounderness, Blackburn, Leyland and Lonsdale were allocated to the Northern division, and the Salford and West Derby hundreds were allocated to the Southern division. The boundary of the two divisions extended approximately from Southport to Wigan, north to Chorley, and then east, passing south of Haslingden, to the Bacup area.

The result of these changes meant the total Parliamentary representation for Lancashire in the reformed House of Commons was 26, an increase of 12. Lancashire benefited more than any other county as a result of these reforms.

The constituency was abolished by the Redistribution of Seats Act 1885, being divided into five single member divisions of Barrow-in-Furness,  Blackpool, Chorley, Lancaster, and North Lonsdale.

Boundaries

1832–1868: The Hundreds of Lonsdale, Amounderness, Leyland and Blackburn.

1868–1885: The Hundreds of Lonsdale, Amounderness and Leyland.

Members of Parliament

Constituency created (1832)

Elections

Elections in the 1830s

Smith-Stanley was appointed as Secretary of State for War and the Colonies, requiring a by-election.

Elections in the 1840s

Smith-Stanley was appointed Secretary of State for War and the Colonies, requiring a by-election.

Smith-Stanley resigned, causing a by-election.

Elections in the 1850s

Elections in the 1860s
Cavendish was appointed a Civil Lord of the Admiralty, requiring a by-election.

Cavendish was appointed Secretary of State for War, requiring a by-election.

Wilson-Patten was appointed Chancellor of the Duchy of Lancaster, requiring a by-election.

Elections in the 1870s

Patten was elevated to the peerage, becoming Lord Winmarleigh, causing a by-election.

Stanley was appointed Secretary of State for War, requiring a by-election.

Elections in the 1880s

 

Stanley was appointed Secretary of State for the Colonies, requiring a by-election.

Notes

Sources

Politics of Lancashire
Parliamentary constituencies in North West England (historic)
Constituencies of the Parliament of the United Kingdom established in 1832
Constituencies of the Parliament of the United Kingdom disestablished in 1885
History of Blackburn with Darwen